Nayef bin Ahmed Al Saud (born 15 July 1965) is a member of Saudi royal family and a military official who was the head of land forces intelligence and security authority. He was detained in March 2020 together with other Saudi royals, including former Crown Prince Mohammed bin Nayef, his father, Ahmed bin Abdulaziz and Nawwaf bin Nayef.

Early life and education
Nayef bin Ahmed was born on 15 July 1965. He is one of Prince Ahmed's children.

Prince Nayef is a graduate of King Abdulaziz War College. In 1986 he received a master's degree in international relations from Georgetown University. Then he obtained another master's degree in business administration from George Washington University. He obtained a PhD from Cambridge University.

Career
In the early 2000s Prince Nayef was a colonel in the Saudi Armed Forces dealing with strategic planning. He also worked at the Ministry of Interior in various capacities. He served as the head of land forces intelligence and security commission.

Arrest
Prince Nayef was arrested in early March 2020.

Personal life
Prince Nayef's wife, Fahda, is the daughter of Khalid bin Abdullah and Al Jawhara bint Abdulaziz.

References

Nayef
Nayef
1965 births
Alumni of the University of Cambridge
Georgetown University alumni
George Washington University alumni
Living people
Nayef
Nayef
Nayef